The usage share of operating systems is the percentage of computing devices that run each operating system (OS) at any particular time. All such figures are necessarily estimates because data about operating system share is difficult to obtain. There are few reliable primary sources and no agreed methodologies for its collection. Operating systems are used in numerous device types, from embedded devices without a screen through to supercomputers.

Most device types that people interact with access the web, so using web access statistics helps compare the usage share of operating systems across most device types, and also the usage share of operating systems used for the same types.

, Android, an operating system using the Linux kernel, is the world's most-used operating system when judged by web use. It has 42% of the global market, followed by Windows with 30%, Apple iOS with 18%, macOS with 6%, then  (desktop) Linux at 1.0%  also using the Linux kernel. These numbers do not include embedded devices or game consoles.

 For smartphones and other pocket-sized devices, Android leads with 71% market share, and Apple's iOS has 28%.
 For desktop and laptop computers, Windows is the most used at 76%, followed by Apple's macOS at 16%, and  Linux-based operating systems at 5% (i.e. "desktop Linux" at 2.6%, plus Google's ChromeOS at 2.4%, in the US up to 6.2%).
 For tablets, Apple's iPadOS has 50.7% and Android has 49.18% worldwide (Android is though more used in vast majority of countries; and on occational days Android measures ahead or even, globally).

For the above devices, smartphones and other pocket-sized devices make up 58%, desktops and laptops 40%, and tablets 2.0%. Smartphones have the most use in virtually all countries, including in the US at 51% there with PC operating systems (including Windows) down to 46%.

 Linux has completely dominated the supercomputer field since 2017, with all of the top 500 most powerful supercomputers in the world running a Linux distribution. Linux is also most used for (web) servers, and then most often Ubuntu used, the most common Linux distribution.

The most numerous type of device with an operating system are embedded systems. These use varied operating systems; a high percentage are standalone or do not have a web browser, which makes their usage share difficult to measure. Hypothetically some operating systems used in embedded systems are more popular than the ones mentioned above.

Worldwide device shipments

In May 2020, Gartner predicted a decline in all market segments for 2020 (from already declining market in 2019) due to COVID-19, predicting a decline by 13.6% for all devices, while "Work from Home Trend Saved PC Market from Collapse", with them only predicting to decline by 10.5% for PCs. However, in the end according to Gartner, PC shipments grew "10.7% in Fourth Quarter of 2020 and [...] reached 275 million units in 2020, a 4.8% increase from 2019 and the highest growth in ten years." Apple in 4th place for PCs had the largest growth in shipments for a company in Q4 of 31.3%, while "the fourth quarter of 2020 was another remarkable period of growth for Chromebooks, with shipments increasing around 200% year over year to reach 11.7 million units. In 2020, Chromebook shipments increased over 80% to total nearly 30 million units, largely due to demand from the North American education market." Chromebooks sold more than Apple's Macs worldwide.

According to Gartner, the following is the worldwide device shipments (referring to wholesale) by operating system, which includes smartphones, tablets, laptops and PCs together.

Shipments (to stores) do not mean sales to consumers (not necessarily in the year of shipment), therefore suggesting the numbers indicate popularity and/or usage could be misleading. Not only do smartphones sell in higher numbers than traditional PCs but also as a whole a lot more, by dollar value with the gap only projected to widen, to well over double.

For 2015 (and earlier), Gartner reports for "the year, worldwide PC shipments declined for the fourth consecutive year, which started in 2012 with the launch of tablets" with an 8% decline in PC sales for 2015 (not including cumulative decline in sales over the previous years). Gartner includes Macs (running macOS) in PC sales numbers (but not e.g. iPads and Androids), and they individually had a slight increase in sales in 2015.

On 28 May 2015, Google announced that there were 1.4 billion Android users and 1 billion Google play users active during that month.  This changed to 2 billion monthly active users in May 2017.

On 27 January 2016, Paul Thurrott summarized the operating system market, the day after Apple announced "one billion devices":

Microsoft backed away from their goal of one billion Windows 10 devices in three years (or "by the middle of 2018") and reported on 26 September 2016 that Windows 10 was running on over 400 million devices, and in March 2019 on more than 800 million.

By late 2016, Android had been explained to be "killing" Apple's iOS market share (i.e. its declining sales of smartphones, not just relatively but also by number of units, when the whole market is increasing) with

As of 9 May 2019, the biggest smartphone companies (by market share) were Samsung, Huawei and Apple, respectively.

Gartner's own press release said, "Apple continued its downward trend with a decline of 7.7 percent in the second quarter of 2016", which is their decline, based on absolute number of units, that underestimates the relative decline (with the market increasing), along with the misleading "1.7 percent [point]" decline. That point decline means an 11.6% relative decline (from 14.6% down to 12.9%).

Although in units sold Apple is declining, they are almost the only vendor making any profit in the smartphone sector from hardware sales alone. In Q3 2016 for example, they captured 103.6% of the market profits.

There are more mobile phone owners than toothbrush owners, with mobile phones the fastest growing technology in history. There are a billion more active mobile phones in the world than people (and many more than 10 billion sold so far with less than half still in use), explained by the fact that some people have more than one, such as an extra for work. All the phones have an operating system, but only a fraction of them are smartphones with an OS capable of running modern applications. Currently 3.1 billion smartphones and tablets are in use across the world (with tablets, a small fraction of the total, generally running the same operating systems, Android or iOS, the latter being more popular on tablets. In 2019, a variant of iOS called iPadOS built for iPad tablets was released).

Tablet computers shipments
In 2015, eMarketer estimated at the beginning of the year that the tablet installed base would hit one billion for the first time (with China's use at 328 million, which Google Play doesn't serve or track, and the United States's use second at 156 million). At the end of the year, because of cheap tablets not counted by all analysts that goal was met (even excluding cumulative sales of previous years) as:

This conflicts with statistics from IDC that say the tablet market contracted by 10% in 2015 with only Huawei, ranked fifth, with big gains, more than doubling their share; for fourth quarter 2015, the five biggest vendors were the same except that Amazon Fire tablets ranked third worldwide, new on the list, enabled by its not quite tripling of market share to 7.9%, with its Fire OS Android-derivative. 

Gartner excludes some devices from their tablet shipment statistic and includes them in a different category called "premium ultramobiles" with screen sizes of more than 10" inches.

Smartphone shipments 

Worldwide smartphone sales to end users by operating systems, as measured by Gartner, International Data Corporation (IDG) and others:

Web clients

The most recent data from various sources published during the last twelve months is summarized in the table below. All of these sources monitor a substantial number of web sites; statistics related to one web site only are excluded.

Android currently ranks highest, above Windows (incl. Xbox console) systems. Windows Phone accounted for 0.51% of the web usage, before it was discontinued.

Considering all personal computing devices, Microsoft Windows is well below 50% usage share on every continent, and at 30% in the US (24% single-day low)  and in many countries lower, e.g. China, and in India at 19% (12% some days) and Windows' lowest share globally was 29% in May 2022 (25% some days), and 29% in the US.

iOS is slightly more popular than Windows in the US, and has been more used the last 6 months, on a monthly average basis, or for up to 11 weeks in a row (weekly average). That's because it's much more popular on the weekends, while Windows usually more used on weekdays. iOS has however been more used for up to almost 2 weeks, every day of that time-span, and even on some days, such as 29 May 2022, Android is also more used than Windows meaning iOS and Android are up to  2.6× more used than Windows there. Worldwide, Android at 43.23% is 48% more used than Windows, next at 29.2%, and iOS third at 17.67% meaning the mobile operating systems Android and iOS are combined a bit over 2× more popular then Windows. In Africa, Android at 62.66% (for May alone is 3.3× (almost 4× with iOS) than Windows at 18.81 (and iOS third at 10.74%). For a 12-month average Android is only 2.1× more popular than Windows in Africa.

Before iOS became the most popular operating system in any independent country, it was most popular in Guam, an unincorporated territory of the United States, for four consecutive quarters in 2017-18, although Android is now the most popular there. iOS has been the highest ranked OS in Jersey (a British Crown dependency in Europe) for years, by a wide margin, and iOS was also highest ranked in Falkland Islands, a British Overseas Territory, for one quarter in 2019, before being overtaken by Android in the following quarter. iOS is competitive with Windows in Sweden, where some days it is more used.

The designation of an "Unknown" operating system is strangely high in a few countries such as Madagascar where it was at 32.44% (no longer near as high). This may be due to the fact that StatCounter uses browser detection to get OS statistics, and there the most common browsers are not often used. The version breakdown for browsers in Madagascar shows "Other" at 34.9%, and Opera Mini 4.4 is the most popular known browser at 22.1% (plus e.g. 3.34% for Opera 7.6). However browser statistics without version-breakdown has Opera at 48.11% with the "Other" category very small.

In China, Android got to be the highest ranked operating system in July 2016 (Windows has occasionally topped it since then, while since April 2016 it or all non-mobile operating systems haven't outranked mobile operating systems, meaning Android plus iOS). In the Asian continent as a whole, Android has been ranked highest since February 2016 and Android alone has the majority share, because of a large majority in all the most populous countries of the continent, up to 84% in Bangladesh, where it has had over 70% share for over four years. Since August 2015, Android is ranked first, at 48.36% in May 2016, in the African continent when it took a big jump ahead of Windows 7, and thereby Africa joined Asia as a mobile-majority continent. China is no longer a desktop-majority country, joining India, which has a mobile-majority of 71%, confirming Asia's significant mobile-majority.

Online usage of Linux kernel derivatives (Android + ChromeOS + other Linux) exceeds that of Windows. This has been true since some time between January and April 2016, according to W3Counter and StatCounter.
However, even before that, the figure for all Unix-like OSes, including those from Apple, was higher than that for Windows.

Desktop and laptop computers

Windows is still the dominant desktop OS, but the dominance varies by region and it has gradually lost market share to other desktop operating systems (not just to mobile) with the slide very noticeable in the US, where macOS usage has more than quadrupled from Jan. 2009 to Dec. 2020 to 30.62% (i.e. in Christmas month; and 34.72% in April 2020 in the middle of COVID-19, and iOS was more popular overall that year; globally Windows lost to Android that year, as for the two years prior), with Windows down to 61.136% and ChromeOS at 5.46%, plus traditional Linux at 1.73%.

There is little openly published information on the device shipments of desktop and laptop computers. Gartner publishes estimates, but the way the estimates are calculated is not openly published. Another source of market share of various operating systems is StatCounter basing its estimate on web use (although this may not be very accurate). Also, sales may overstate usage. Most computers are sold with a pre-installed operating system, with some users replacing that OS with a different one due to personal preference, or installing another OS alongside it and using both. Conversely, sales underestimate usage by not counting unauthorized copies. For example, in 2009, approximately 80% of software sold in China consisted of illegitimate copies. In 2007, the statistics from an automated update of IE7 for registered Windows computers differed with the observed web browser share, leading one writer to estimate that 25–35% of all Windows XP installations were unlicensed.

The usage share of Microsoft's (then latest operating system) Windows 10 has slowly increased since July/August 2016, reaching around 27.15% (of all Windows versions, not all desktop or all operating systems) in December 2016. It eventually reached 79.79% on 5 October 2021, the same day on which its successor Windows 11 was released.

Web analysis shows significant variation in different parts of the world. For example, macOS use varies a lot by region, in North America claims 16.82% (17.52% in the US) whereas in Asia it is only 4.4%. In the United States usage of Windows XP has dropped to 0.38% (of all Windows versions), and its global average to 0.59%, while in Africa it is still at 2.71%, and it still has double-digit share in at least one country.

The 2019 Stack Overflow developer survey provides no detail about particular versions of Windows. The desktop operating system share among those identifying as professional developers was:
 Windows: 45.3%
 macOS: 29.2%
 Linux: 25.3%
 BSD/Unix: 0.1%

Microsoft data on Windows usage
In June 2016, Microsoft claimed Windows 10 had half the market share of all Windows installations in the US and UK, as quoted by BetaNews:

Desktop computer games
The digital video game distribution platform Steam publishes a monthly "Hardware & Software Survey", with the statistics below:

 These figures, as reported by Steam, do not include SteamOS statistics.

Mobile devices

Smartphones OS by usage

By Q1 2018, mobile operating systems on smartphones included Google's dominant Android (and variants) and Apple's iOS which combined had an almost 100% market share.

Smartphone penetration vs. desktop use differs substantially by country. Some countries, like Russia, still have smartphone use as low as 22.35% (as a fraction of all web use), but in most western countries, smartphone use is close to 50% of all web use. This doesn't mean that only half of the population has a smartphone, could mean almost all have, just that other platforms have about equal use.  Smartphone usage share in developing countries is much higher in Bangladesh, for example, Android smartphones had up to 84% and currently 70% share, and in Mali smartphones had over 90% (up to 95%) share for almost two years.  (A section below has more information on regional trends on the move to smartphones.)

There is a clear correlation between the GDP per capita of a country and that country's respective smartphone OS market share, with users in the richest countries being much more likely to choose Apple's iPhone, with Google's Android being predominant elsewhere.

Tablet computers OS by usage

Tablet computers, or simply tablets, became a significant OS market share category starting with Apple's iPad. In Q1 2018, iOS had 65.03% market share and Android had 34.58% market share. Windows tablets may not get classified as such by some analysts, and thus barely register; e.g. 2-in-1 PCs may get classified as "desktops", not tablets.

Since 2016, in South America (and Cuba in North America), Android tablets have gained majority, and in Asia in 2017 Android was slightly more popular than the iPad, which was at 49.05% usage share in October 2015. In Africa, Android tablets are much more popular while elsewhere the iPad has a safe margin.

, Android has made steady gains to becoming the most popular tablet operating system: that is the trend in many countries, having already gained the majority in large countries (India at 63.25%, and in Indonesia at 62.22%) and in the African continent with Android at 62.22% (first to gain Android majority in late 2014), with steady gains from 20.98% in August 2012 (Egypt at 62.37%, Zimbabwe at 62.04%), and South America at 51.09% in July 2015. (Peru at 52.96%). Asia is at 46%. In Nepal, Android gained majority lead in November 2014 but lost it down to 41.35% with iOS at 56.51%. In Taiwan, as of October 2016, Android after having gained a confident majority, has been on a losing streak. China is a major exception to Android gaining market share in Asia (there Android phablets are much more popular than Android tablets, while similar devices get classified as smartphones) where the iPad/iOS is at 82.84% in March 2015.

Crossover to smartphones having majority share

According to StatCounter web use statistics (a proxy for all use), smartphones are more popular than desktop computers globally (and Android in particular more popular than Windows). Including tablets with mobiles/smartphones, as they also run so-called mobile operating systems, even in the United States (and most countries) are mobiles including tablets more popular than other (older originally made for desktops) operating systems (such as Windows and macOS). Windows in the US (at 33.42%) has only 8% head-start (2.55-percentage points) over iOS only; with Android, that mobile operating system and iOS have 52.14% majority. Alternatively, Apple, with iOS plus their non-mobile macOS (9.33%) has 20% more share (6.7-percentage points more) than Microsoft's Windows in the country where both companies were built.

Although desktop computers are still popular in many countries (while overall down to 44.9% in the first quarter of 2017), smartphones are more popular even in many developed countries. A few countries on all continents are desktop-minority with Android more popular than Windows; many, e.g. Poland in Europe, and about half of the countries in South America, and many in North America, e.g. Guatemala, Honduras, Haiti; up to most countries in Asia and Africa with smartphone-majority because of Android, Poland and Turkey in Europe highest with 57.68% and 62.33%, respectively. In Ireland, smartphone use at 45.55% outnumbers desktop use and mobile as a whole gains majority when including the tablet share at 9.12%. Spain was also slightly desktop-minority. As of July 2019, Sweden had been desktop-minority for eight weeks in a row.

The range of measured mobile web use varies a lot by country, and a StatCounter press release recognizes "India amongst world leaders in use of mobile to surf the internet" (of the big countries) where the share is around (or over) 80% and desktop is at 19.56%, with Russia trailing with 17.8% mobile use (and desktop the rest).

Smartphones (discounting tablets), first gained majority in December 2016 (desktop-majority was lost the month before), and it wasn't a Christmas-time fluke, as while close to majority after smartphone majority happened again in March 2017.

In the week of 7–13 November 2016, smartphones alone (without tablets) overtook desktop for the first time, albeit for a short period. Examples of mobile-majority countries include Paraguay in South America, Poland in Europe and Turkey and most of Asia and Africa. Some of the world is still desktop-majority, with for example the United States at 54.89% (but not on all days). However, in some territories of the United States, such as Puerto Rico, desktop is significantly under majority, with Windows just under 25%, overtaken by Android.

On 22 October 2016 (and subsequent weekends), mobile showed majority. Since 27 October, the desktop hasn't had a majority, including on weekdays. Smartphones alone have showed majority since 23 December to the end of the year, with the share topping at 58.22% on Christmas Day. To the "mobile"-majority share of smartphones, tablets could be added giving a  63.22% majority. While an unusually high top, a similar high also occurred on Monday 17 April 2017, with the smartphone share slightly lower and tablet share slightly higher, combining to 62.88%.

For the Christmas season (i.e. temporarily, while desktop-minority remains and smartphone-majority on weekends), the last two weeks in December 2016, Australia (and Oceania in general) was desktop-minority for the first time for an extended period, i.e. every day from 23 December.

In South America, smartphones alone took majority from desktops on Christmas Day, but for a full-week-average, desktop is still at least at 58%.

The UK desktop-minority dropped down to 44.02% on Christmas Day and for the eight days to the end of the year. Ireland joined some other European countries with smartphone-majority, for three days after Christmas, topping that day at 55.39%.

In the US, desktop-minority happened for three days on and around Christmas (while a longer four-day stretch happened in November, and happens frequently on weekends).

According to StatCounter web use statistics (a proxy for all use), in the week from 7–13 November 2016, "mobile" (meaning smartphones) alone (without tablets) overtook desktop, for the first time, with them highest ranked at 52.13% (on 27 November 2016) or up to 49.02% for a full week. Mobile-majority applies to countries such as Paraguay in South America, Poland in Europe and Turkey; and the continents Asia and Africa. Large regions of the rest of the world are still desktop-majority, while on some days, the United States, (and North America as a whole) isn't; the US is desktop-minority up to four days in a row, and up to a five-day average. Other examples, of desktop-minority on some days, include the UK, Ireland, Australia (and Oceania as a whole); in fact, at least one country on every continent has turned desktop-minority (for at least a month). On 22 October 2016 (and subsequent weekends), mobile has shown majority.

The biggest continents, Asia and Africa, have shown vast mobile-majority for long time (any day of the week), as well as several individual countries elsewhere have also turned mobile-majority: Poland, Albania (and Turkey) in Europe and Paraguay and Bolivia in South America.

According to StatCounter's web use statistics, Saturday 28 May 2016, was the day when smartphones ("mobile" at StatCounter, that now counts tablets separately) became a most used platform, ranking first, at 47.27%, above desktops. The next day, desktops slightly outnumbered "mobile" (unless counting tablets: some analysts count tablets with smartphones or separately while others with desktops even when most tablets are iPad or Android, not Windows devices).

Since Sunday 27 March 2016, the first day the world dipped to desktop-minority, it has happened almost every week, and by week of 11–17 July 2016, the world was desktop-minority, followed by the next week, and thereon also for a three-week period. The trend is still stronger on weekends, with e.g. 17 July 2016 showed desktop at 44.67%, "mobile" at 49.5% plus tablets at 5.7%. Recent weekly data shows a downward trend for desktops.

According to StatCounter web use statistics (a proxy for overall use), on weekends desktops worldwide lose about 5 percent points, e.g. down to 51.46% on 15 August 2015, with the loss in (relative) web use going to mobile (and also a minuscule increase for tablets), mostly because Windows 7, ranked 1st on workdays, declines in web use, with it shifting to Android and lesser degree to iOS.

Two continents have already crossed over to mobile-majority (because of Android), based on StatCounters web use statistics. In June 2015, Asia became the first continent where mobile overtook desktop (followed by Africa in August; while Nigeria had mobile majority in October 2011, because of Symbian that later had 51% share, then Series 40 dominating, followed by Android as dominating operating system) and as far back as October 2014, they had reported this trend on a large scale in a press release: "Mobile usage has already overtaken desktop in several countries including India, South Africa and Saudi Arabia". In India, desktop went from majority, in July 2012, down to 32%. In Bangladesh desktop went from majority, in May 2013, down to 17%, with Android alone now accounting for majority web use. Only a few African countries were still desktop-majority and many have a large mobile majority including Ethiopia and Kenya, where mobile usage is over 72%.

The popularity of mobile use worldwide has been driven by the huge popularity increase of Android in Asian countries, where Android is the highest ranked operating system statistically in virtually every south-east Asian country, while it also ranks most popular in almost every African country. Poland has been desktop-minority since April 2015, because of Android being vastly more popular there, and other European countries, such as Albania (and Turkey), have also crossed over. The South America continent is somewhat far from losing desktop-majority, but Paraguay had lost it . Android and mobile browsing in general has also become hugely popular in all other continents where desktop has a large desktop base and the trend to mobile is not as clear as a fraction of the total web use.

While some analysts count tablets with desktops (as some of them run Windows), others count them with mobile phones (as the vast majority of tablets run so-called mobile operating systems, such as Android or iOS on the iPad). iPad has a clear lead globally, but has clearly lost the majority to Android in South America, and a number of Eastern European countries such as Poland; lost virtually all African countries and has lost the majority twice in Asia, but gained the majority back (while many individual countries, e.g. India and most of the middle East have clear Android majority on tablets). Android on tablets is thus second most popular after the iPad.

In March 2015, for the first time in the US the number of mobile-only adult internet users exceeded the number of desktop-only internet users with 11.6% of the digital population only using mobile compared to 10.6% only using desktop; this also means the majority, 78%, use both desktop and mobile to access the internet. A few smaller countries in North America, such as Haiti (because of Android) have gone mobile majority (mobile went to up to 72.35%, and is at 64.43% in February 2016).

Revenue
The region with the largest Android usage also has the largest mobile revenue.

Public servers on the Internet

Internet based servers' market share can be measured with statistical surveys of publicly accessible servers, such as web servers, mail servers or DNS servers on the Internet: the operating systems powering such servers are found by inspecting raw response messages. This method gives insight only into market share of operating systems that are publicly accessible on the Internet.

There will be differences in the result depending on how the sample is done and observations weighted. Usually the surveys are not based on a random sample of all IP addresses, domain names, hosts or organisations, but on servers found by some other method. Additionally, many domains and IP addresses may be served by one host and some domains may be served by several hosts or by one host with several IP addresses.

Note Revenue comparisons often include "operating system software, other bundled software" and are not appropriate for usage comparison as the Linux operating system costs nothing (including "other bundled software"), except if optionally using commercial distributions such as Red Hat Enterprise Linux (in that case, cost of software for all software bundled with hardware has to be known for all operating systems involved, and subtracted). In cases where no-cost Linux is used, such comparisons underestimate Linux server popularity and overestimate other proprietary operating systems such as Unix and Windows.

Mainframes

Mainframes are larger and more powerful than servers, but not supercomputers. They are used to process large sets of data, for example enterprise resource planning or credit card transactions.

The most common operating system for mainframes is IBM's z/OS. Operating systems for IBM Z generation hardware include IBM's proprietary z/OS, Linux on IBM Z, z/TPF, z/VSE and z/VM.

Gartner reported on 23 December 2008, that Linux on System z was used on approximately 28% of the "customer z base" and that they expected this to increase to over 50% in the following five years. Of Linux on IBM Z, Red Hat and Micro Focus compete to sell RHEL and SLES respectively:
 Prior to 2006, Novell claimed a market share of 85% or more for SUSE Linux Enterprise Server.
 Red Hat has since claimed 18.4% in 2007 and 37% in 2008.
 Gartner reported at the end of 2008 that Novell's SUSE Linux Enterprise Server had an 80% share of mainframe Linux.

Decline
Like today's trend of mobile devices from personal computers, in 1984 for the first time estimated sales of desktop computers ($11.6 billion) exceeded mainframe computers ($11.4 billion). IBM received the vast majority of mainframe revenue.

From 1991 to 1996, AT&T Corporation briefly owned NCR, one of the major original mainframe producers. During the same period, companies found that servers based on microcomputer designs could be deployed at a fraction of the acquisition price and offer local users much greater control over their own systems given the IT policies and practices at that time. Terminals used for interacting with mainframe systems were gradually replaced by personal computers. Consequently, demand plummeted and new mainframe installations were restricted mainly to financial services and government. In the early 1990s, there was a rough consensus among industry analysts that the mainframe was a dying market as mainframe platforms were increasingly replaced by personal computer networks.

In 2012, NASA powered down its last mainframe, an IBM System z9. However, IBM's successor to the z9, the z10, led a New York Times reporter to state four years earlier that "mainframe technology—hardware, software and services—remains a large and lucrative business for IBM, and mainframes are still the back-office engines behind the world's financial markets and much of global commerce". , while mainframe technology represented less than 3% of IBM's revenues, it "continue[d] to play an outsized role in Big Blue's results".

Supercomputers

The TOP500 project lists and ranks the 500 fastest supercomputers for which benchmark results are submitted. Since the early 1990s, the field of supercomputers has been dominated by Unix or Unix-like operating systems, and starting in 2017, every top 500 fastest supercomputer uses Linux as its supercomputer operating system.

The last supercomputer to rank #1 while using an operating system other than Linux was ASCI White, which ran AIX. It held the title from November 2000 to November 2001, and was decommissioned in 2006. Then in June 2017, two AIX computers held rank 493 and 494, the last non-Linux systems before they dropped off the list.

Historically all kinds of Unix operating systems dominated, and in the end ultimately Linux remains.

Market share by category

See also
 Comparison of operating systems
 List of operating systems
 Timeline of operating systems
 Usage share of web browsers
 Mobile OS market share

Notes

References

Usage share of operating systems
Operating systems